This a list of the Spanish PROMUSICAE Top 20 Singles number-ones of 2007.

See also 
2007 in music
List of number-one hits in Spain

References

Number-one singles
Spain singles
2007